Dinesh Chandra Sarkar is a Bharatiya Janata Party politician from Assam. He has been elected in Assam Legislative Assembly election in 2001 from Golakganjt constituency.

References 

Living people
Bharatiya Janata Party politicians from Assam
Members of the Assam Legislative Assembly
People from Dhubri district
Year of birth missing (living people)